The 2013 battle of Tell Abyad was a military confrontation in the town of Tell Abyad between the Kurdish Front and the Democratic Union Party-affiliated People's Protection Units and Women's Protection Units against the Islamic State of Iraq and the Levant, the al-Nusra Front (both al-Qaeda affiliates), and Ahrar al-Sham, resulting in a Kurdish defeat and the jihadist capture of the town.

Background

Tell Abyad is located across the town of Akçakale on the Syria-Turkey border. On 19 September 2012 the Farouq Brigades captured Tell Abyad from Syrian government forces. In March 2013, the al-Nusra Front set up a checkpoint and captured 33 fighters from the Farouq Brigades. Clashes between the two groups resulted in the Farouq commander, Abu Azzam, being wounded in action. Abu Azzam previously survived an assassination attempt by car bomb. He and other wounded rebels was transferred to a hospital in Şanlıurfa, Turkey. The next week, the 33 Farouq prisoners were released and the border crossing reopened.

On 17 July 2013, the YPG fully captured the city of Ras al-Ayn from ISIL and al-Nusra. The latter retreated to the northern Raqqa Governorate, mainly in Tell Abyad. ISIL and al-Nusra Front fighters arrested many Syrian Kurds on charges of Kurdish nationalism. ISIL also called on the residents of Tell Abyad to pledge allegiance to their self-proclaimed caliphate. In response a YPG battalion was formed in the Kurdish neighbourhoods of the town.

Battle
On 20 July 2013, the Kurdish Front Brigade captured Khalaf Thiyab "Abu Musab", an al-Nusra commander and 4 other Nusra members on charges that they attempted to blow up themselves in the "People's House", the Democratic Union Party office in Tell Abyad. Clashes then erupted in the town. By the next day, more than 1,000 residents were detained by Islamist groups in order to pressure the PYD to release the al-Nusra members, and both were released. Hundreds of residents fled the town. 

On 22 July, ISIL raided, looted, and demolished dozens of houses of the hundreds of Kurdish civilians who fled after their neighbourhoods were attacked by tanks and other heavy weapons. More than 10 al-Nusra fighters were killed. YPG and Kurdish Front forces surrounded the Akçakale border crossing which was then closed by Turkey. By the next week, ISIL defeated the Kurdish forces and took full control of Tell Abyad, forcing thousands of Kurdish civilians to flee.

Aftermath
Many Kurdish refugees from Tell Abyad fled to nearby Tell Akhdar. 70% of its residents had already fled. In August 2013 Ahrar al-Sham took over the village. On 13 October, clashes renewed between joint Kurdish forces and ISIL west of Tell Abyad.

In January 2014, infighting erupted between Ahrar al-Sham and ISIL and the latter gained complete control over the Tell Abyad countryside. Clashes between the YPG and ISIL west of Tell Abyad again renewed in March. Hundreds of ISIL militants surrounded Tell Akhdar and threatened to kill all those who remained in the village. All residents fled and most became refugees in Kobanî, which was also besieged.

In February 2015, Euphrates Volcano forces advanced into the northern Raqqa countryside from both the west and the east, capturing 19 villages. Tell Abyad was then captured on 16 June 2015.

References

Military operations of the Syrian civil war in 2013
Military operations of the Syrian civil war involving the Islamic State of Iraq and the Levant
Military operations of the Syrian civil war involving the al-Nusra Front
Military operations of the Syrian civil war involving the People's Protection Units
Raqqa Governorate in the Syrian civil war
Ethnic cleansing by the Islamic State of Iraq and the Levant
Persecution of Kurds in Syria
Battles of the Syrian civil war
Racism in the Arab world